Marc Dewsbury (born 16 October 1974) is a former English professional darts player who has played in the Professional Darts Corporation (PDC) events.

Dewsbury qualified for the 2014 German Darts Championship on the PDC European Tour, but lost in the first round to Jelle Klaasen. He also qualified for the UK Open in 2012, and had a PDC Tour Card between 2013 and 2014.

References

External links

English darts players
1974 births
Living people
Professional Darts Corporation former tour card holders